The Hanover Township Public Schools is a comprehensive community public school district that serves students in kindergarten through eighth grade from Hanover Township, in Morris County, New Jersey, United States, including its Cedar Knolls and Whippany neighborhoods.

As of the 2018–19 school year, the district, comprising four schools, had an enrollment of 1,382 students and 129.5 classroom teachers (on an FTE basis), for a student–teacher ratio of 10.7:1.

The district is classified by the New Jersey Department of Education as being in District Factor Group "I", the second-highest of eight groupings. District Factor Groups organize districts statewide to allow comparison by common socioeconomic characteristics of the local districts. From lowest socioeconomic status to highest, the categories are A, B, CD, DE, FG, GH, I and J.

Students in public school for ninth through twelfth grades attend Whippany Park High School in the Whippany section of Hanover Township, as part of the Hanover Park Regional High School District, which also serves students from the neighboring communities of East Hanover Township and Florham Park, who attend Hanover Park High School in East Hanover. As of the 2018–19 school year, the high school had an enrollment of 642 students and 58.4 classroom teachers (on an FTE basis), for a student–teacher ratio of 11.0:1.

Awards and recognition
During the 1998-99 school year, Bee Meadow Elementary School was awarded the Blue Ribbon School Award of Excellence by the United States Department of Education, the highest award an American school can receive.

Schools
Schools in the district (with 2018–19 enrollment data from the National Center for Education Statistics) are:

Elementary schools
Bee Meadow School with 334 students in grades K-5
Darrin Stark, Principal
Mountview Road School with 317 students in grades K-5
Carmen Bellino, Principal
Salem Drive School with 242 students in grades K-5
Roberto Camean, Principal
Middle school
Memorial Junior School with 478 students in grades 6-8
Michael Anderson, Principal

Administration
Core members of the district's administration are:

Michael J. Wasko, Superintendent
Vanessa M. Wolsky, Business Administrator / Board Secretary

Board of education
The district's board of education, with nine members, sets policy and oversees the fiscal and educational operation of the district through its administration. As a Type II school district, the board's trustees are elected directly by voters to serve three-year terms of office on a staggered basis, with three seats up for election each year held (since 2013) as part of the November general election.

References

External links

School Data for the Hanover Township Public Schools, National Center for Education Statistics

Hanover Township, New Jersey
New Jersey District Factor Group I
School districts in Morris County, New Jersey